The Strong in Spirit is the debut album by folk artist Hugh Blumenfeld. It was released in 1988 (see 1988 in music) by Prime CD.

Track listing
"Brothers"  – 2:59
"Leather and Lace"  – 2:39
"Let Me Fall in Love Before the Spring Comes"  – 4:02
"All of Wood of Lebanon  – 3:02
"Sailing to the New World  – 3:14
"Strong in Spirit"  – 2:22
"Rising Moon"  – 3:38
"Soweto"  – 5:09
"I Knew a Boy"  – 3:13
"Song of Florence"  – 5:47
"Get the Word"  – 3:00

Personnel
Hugh Blumenfeld - Guitar, Main Performer, Vocals
Marshall Rosenberg - Percussion, Arranger, Bongos, Conga
David Seitz - Producer, Remixing, Mixing
Judith Zweiman - Arranger, Vocals, Harmony Vocals
Peter Lewy - Arranger, Cello
Nikki Matheson - Arranger, Harmony Vocals, Vocals
Arthur Simoes - Photography
Lucy Kaplansky  - Arranger, Harmony Vocals, Vocals
Diane Chodkowski - Arranger, Harmony Vocals, Vocals
Kenny Kosek - Violin, Arranger
Mark Dann - Synthesizer, Guitar, Engineer, Arranger, Mixing, Guitar (Bass), Sampling
Bill Kollar - ?, Digital Mastering
Josh Joffen - Arranger, Vocals, Harmony Vocals
Richard Meyer - Arranger, Vocals, Harmony Vocals

References

Hugh Blumenfeld albums
1988 debut albums